Claus Bonderup (born 14 November 1943) is a Danish architect and professor emeritus in architecture at Aalborg University. He has created a large number of edifices and designs as well as city plans. Among the most renowned are the Arctic Museum in Rovaniemi, Finland, the palace of the Kuwaiti Sheik Salkem Al-Ali Al-Sabah and Professor Bonderup’s own house in the dunes near the town of Blokhus in the northern part of Jutland. Designs by Claus Bonderup have also been used by  companies such as Royal Copenhagen and Georg Jensen A/S. His works are represented in the permanent collection of the Museum of Modern Art in New York.

Following graduation from the Royal Danish Academy of Fine Arts, School of Architecture in 1969, Claus Bonderup worked at architectural practices both in Denmark and abroad. In 1991 he married the painter and ceramic artist Anne Just, with whom he established the famous garden of Hune. Six years later, Claus Bonderup became a professor at Aalborg University, and has since become a visiting professor at universities in France, Germany, Norway and Finland.

Professor Bonderup has been awarded a number of prizes, including the industrial design competition at The Royal Danish Academy of Fine Arts and the Eckersberg Medal.

References 

Living people
Academic staff of Aalborg University
21st-century Danish architects
20th-century Danish architects
1943 births
Danish designers
Industrial designers
Furniture designers